Van Campen is a Dutch and German surname, and may refer to:
 
Cretien van Campen (born 1963), Dutch author
Jacob van Campen (1596–1657), Dutch architect
Schouwburg of Van Campen, theatre built by Jacob
John van Campen (died 1583), German scholar of Hebrew
 Van Campen's Inn, a historic 1746 stonehouse located in Walpack Township, New Jersey the Delaware Water Gap National Recreation Area

Surnames of Dutch origin